CBX7 may refer to:
 CBX7 (gene), a human gene.
 CBX7, the Transport Canada location identifier of Tumbler Ridge Airport